Master/slave is a model of asymmetric communication or control where one device or process (the "master") controls one or more other devices or processes (the "slaves") and serves as their communication hub. In some systems, a master is selected from a group of eligible devices, with the other devices acting in the role of slaves.

The master/slave terminology was first used in 1904. Since the early 21st century, the terms have become a subject of controversy from their association with slavery and some organizations have opted to replace them with alternative terms.

Examples 

 In electronics, master/slave relationships are used to describe some of the following scenarios:
 In parallel ATA hard drive arrangements, the terms master and slave are used to describe drives on the same cable, but neither drive has control or priority over the other.
 A master clock that provides time signals used to synchronize one or more slave clocks as part of a clock network.
 In AXI, master and slave have differing roles, with master initiating transactions and the slave responding to those transactions.
 A Serial Peripheral Interface bus typically has a single master controlling multiple slaves. Many people recommend using more modern terms (controller, peripheral, etc.) and discontinuing the use of master/slave terms.
 Edge-triggered flip-flops can be created by arranging two latches (master latch and slave latch) in a master/slave configuration. It is named because the master latch controls the slave latch's value and forces the slave latch to hold its value, as the slave latch always copies its new value from the master latch.
 In database replication, the master database is regarded as the authoritative source, and the slave (also called replica) databases are synchronized to it.
 In photography, secondary or slave flash units may be synchronized to the master unit to provide light from additional directions.
 Duplication is often done with several cassette tapes or compact disc recorders linked together. Operating the controls on the master triggers the same commands on the slaves so that recording is done in parallel.
 Railway locomotives operating in multiple (for example: to pull loads too heavy for a single locomotive) can be referred to as a master/slave configuration with the operation of all locomotives in the train slaved to the controls of the first locomotive. See Multiple-unit train control.
 In automotive engineering, the master cylinder is a control device that converts force into hydraulic pressure in the brake system. This device controls slave cylinders located at the other end of the hydraulic system.

Early usages 
The master/slave terminology was used in 1988 for RFC 1059 and in 1997 for RFC 2136, related to the domain name system. In 2020, Paul Vixie commented on his choice of words:

I introduced the master/slave terminology in RFC 2136, because I needed names for the roles in an AXFR/IXFR transaction, and the zone transfer hierarchy could be more than one layer deep, such that a server might initiate some AXFR/IXFR's to the "primary master" but then respond to AXFR/IXFR's from other servers. In retrospect I should have chosen the terms, "transfer initiator" and "transfer responder". However, the hydraulic brake and clutch systems in my car had "master cylinders" and "slave cylinders", and so I did not think I was either inventing a new use for the words "master" and "slave", or that my use of them for this purpose would be controversial.

Said hydraulic brakes for the automotive industry were patented in 1917 by Malcolm Loughead. The term slave cylinder was used in other patent applications, including one by Robert Esnault-Pelterie, published in 1919.

Terminology concerns 
In 2003, after receiving a discrimination complaint from a county employee, the County of Los Angeles in California asked that manufacturers, suppliers and contractors stop using master and slave terminology on products. Following complaints, the County of Los Angeles issued a statement saying that the decision was "nothing more than a request". Media analytics company Global Language Monitor placed the term first in their annual list of politically charged language for 2004. In 2018, after a heated debate, developers of the Python programming language replaced the term. The Black Lives Matter movement in the United States sparked renewed discussion and terminology changes in 2020. Some have argued that the change is superficial and that companies should make real change to support the black community. Google's developer documentation style guide recommends avoiding the term master in software documentation, especially in combination with slave.

Other terminology 
Various replacement terms for 'master' or 'slave' have been proposed and implemented. In 2020, GitHub replaced the default 'master' git branch with 'main', although this action was controversial because of the term's etymology—for example, a master copy of an audio recording. Other replacement names include 'default', 'primary', 'controller', 'root', 'initiator', 'leader', 'director'; and for 'slave': 'performer', 'worker', 'peripheral', 'responder', 'device', 'replica', 'satellite', and 'secondary'. Python switched to 'main', 'parent', and 'server'; and 'worker', 'child', and 'helper', depending on context. The Linux kernel has adopted a similar policy to use more specific terms in new code or documentation. Many projects and standards have already used alternative terms since their inception.

See also 
 Flexible single master operation
 Bus mastering
 Master clock
 Multi-master replication
 SCSI initiator and target

References 

Network protocols
Distributed computing architecture